Friska Viljor may refer to:

 Friska Viljor (band), Swedish indie rock band
 Friska Viljor FC, Swedish football club
 IF Friska Viljor, Swedish ski club